Anikudichan may refer to any of the following villages in Ariyalur district, Tamil Nadu, India:

 Anikudichan (North)
 Anikudichan (South)